The athletics competition in the 2005 Summer Universiade was held on the İzmir Atatürk Stadyumu in İzmir, Turkey, between 15 August and 20 August 2005.

Medal summary

Men's events

Women's events

Medal table

See also
2005 in athletics (track and field)

References
World Student Games (Universiade – Men) – GBR Athletics
World Student Games (Universiade – Women) – GBR Athletics
Finals results – FIBU
Partial results – Tilastopaja

 
2005 Summer Universiade
Universiade
2005
International athletics competitions hosted by Turkey